Robert Wayne Loftin (1938–1993) was an American environmentalist, ornithologist, and philosopher. He was a professor at the University of North Florida, where he founded the Sawmill Slough Conservation Club and designed the campus's nature trails. The trails on UNF's campus were subsequently renamed the Robert Loftin Nature Trails in his memory on August 31, 1993.

Loftin received his B.A. in humanities from Oglethorpe University and his M.A. and Ph.D. degrees from Florida State University. In 1988, he received the University of North Florida's Distinguished Professor Award. He died of cancer on August 13, 1993, at the age of 54.

Brian G. Norton, Michael Hutchins, Elizabeth F. Stevens, and Terry L. Maple dedicated the edited volume entitled, Ethics on the Ark: Zoos, Animal Welfare, and Wildlife Conservation (1995), published by Smithsonian Institution Press, to the memory of Robert W. Loftin.  In his own posthumous article in this volume, entitled, "Captive Breeding of Endangered Species," Loftin concluded that, "animals should be taken out of the wild for captive breeding programs only if there is no alternative to extinction"; otherwise, "the priorities should be on maintaining the species intact in the wild and correcting the causes of endangerment in the first place."

References

Further reading

1938 births
1993 deaths
20th-century American philosophers
20th-century American zoologists
University of North Florida faculty
Oglethorpe University alumni
Florida State University alumni
American ornithologists
American environmentalists
Deaths from cancer in the United States